Biff Moyer (born David Lee Morelock, January 17, 1964), who became known under the name Biff Uranus Blumfumgagnge, is an American musician, guitar technician, sound engineer, record producer and instructor of music and recording technology at the Madison Media Institute.

Early life
Born in Milwaukee, he was adopted and grew up in Madison, Wisconsin.  He took on his legal name (pronounced Blumm-fumm-gog-in-ya) in 1992.

Toured and recorded with
Pat MacDonald, Willy Porter (February 1990–present), King Crimson (August 2008), Sigtryggur Baldursson (drummer of the Sugarcubes, 1993–1997), Eugene Chadbourne, Reptile Palace Orchestra, The Gomers, Natty Nation, Bradley Fish, The Kissers, Wisconsin Youth Symphony Orchestra, and Zombeatles.

Performed with
Les Paul, & Steve Miller (November 2005), Adrian Belew (March 1992–present), Eugene Chadbourne (February 2004–present), Lee "Scratch" Perry (August 25, 2008), Reptile Palace Orchestra (April 1994–present), The Gomers (December 1986–present), Natty Nation (February 1993–present), Jambeau (May 2001–present), Bradley Fish (January 1996-September 1997),  John Kruth (April 2003-November 2005),  Joan Wildman (February 1991), Clyde Stubblefield (James Brown's "funky drummer", March 1991-April 2007), Killbilly (April 1994), The Appliances-SFB (December 1997), Jimmy Carl Black (October 2007), Stuart Stotts (September 2002-August 2007) and Project/Object with Napoleon Murphy Brock (October 23, 2007), and Yid Vicious (2005–Present).

Discography

MAMA (Madison Area Music) Awards
Awarded Best Instrumentalist in 2005

WAMI (Wisconsin Area Music Industry) Awards
Awarded Best Instrumentalist in 1998

Notes

External links
 Home Page
 Soundcloud
 Tales From The Gomers

1964 births
Living people
Record producers from Wisconsin
Musicians from Madison, Wisconsin
Guitarists from Wisconsin
American male violinists
American mandolinists
American male guitarists
20th-century American drummers
American male drummers
20th-century American guitarists
21st-century American violinists
20th-century American male musicians
21st-century American male musicians
21st-century American drummers
21st-century American guitarists
20th-century American violinists